Fifth Avenue is a major thoroughfare in Manhattan, New York City.

Fifth Avenue may also refer to:

Streets 
5th Avenue, Caloocan and Quezon City, Philippines
Fifth Avenue (Brooklyn)
  (Fifth Avenue), boulevard in Miramar, Havana, Cuba
Fifth Avenue (Pittsburgh)

Buildings 
Fifth Avenue Place (Calgary), a skyscraper on 5th Avenue in Calgary, Alberta
Fifth Avenue Place (Pittsburgh), a skyscraper on 5th Avenue in Pittsburgh
5th Avenue Theatre, a theater in Seattle, Washington
Anchorage 5th Avenue Mall

Transit 
Several New York City Subway stations in Manhattan:
Fifth Avenue–59th Street (BMT Broadway Line), at 59th Street; serving the  trains
Fifth Avenue/53rd Street (IND Queens Boulevard Line), at 53rd Street; serving the  trains
Fifth Avenue (IRT Flushing Line), at 42nd Street; serving the  trains
Fifth Avenue Line (Brooklyn elevated), demolished Brooklyn–Manhattan Transit Corporation rapid transit line
Fifth Avenue Line (Brooklyn surface), a singular bus route in Brooklyn
Madison and Fifth Avenues buses, several bus routes in Manhattan
Fifth Avenue Bus Company, a former double-decker manufacturer
Fifth Avenue Coach Company and Surface Transit, a former bus operator in Manhattan
5th Avenue station (LRT), a train station on the Manila LRT Line 1 in Caloocan, Philippines
5th Avenue station (PNR), a train station on the Philippine National Railways in Caloocan, Philippines

Other 
5th Avenue (candy), a candy bar introduced in 1936
Chrysler Fifth Avenue, a large car
Saks Fifth Avenue, department store chain in the United States
Fifth Avenue High School, Pittsburgh, Pennsylvania
Fifth Avenue Vietnam Peace Parade Committee, an anti-war parade coordinator during the mid-1960s
5th Avenue (album), an album by Christina Aguilar
5th Avenue Cinema, a projection theater in Portland, Oregon
5th Avenue Theatre, a landmark theatre building located in Seattle, Washington
Fifth Avenue Theatre, a Broadway theatre in New York City demolished in 1939
Fifth Avenue (film), a 1926 American silent drama film
Avenue 5, a 2020 comedy series

See also

Fifth Street (disambiguation)